Luq Barcoo (born July 27, 1998) is an American football cornerback for the San Antonio Brahmas of the XFL. He was the first defensive player ever drafted by the San Antonio Brahmas. He played college football at San Diego State University, and signed as an undrafted free agent with the Jacksonville Jaguars in 2020.

College career 
Barcoo received no college offers out of high school. He initially enrolled at Grossmont Community College in El Cajon, California, where he had 21 total tackles, 2 interceptions, and 4 pass breakups. The following season, he was moved to wide receiver where he caught 35 receptions for 767 yards and 7 touchdowns.

After two seasons at Grossmont, Barcoo transferred to San Diego State. During the 2018 seasons, he recorded one interception, five pass breakups, and seven tackles. In 2019, he led college football in interceptions, passes defended, and pass breakups.

Professional career

Jacksonville Jaguars
Barcoo went undrafted in the 2020 NFL Draft. He was signed by the Jacksonville Jaguars. He was waived on August 19, 2021.

Arizona Cardinals
On August 20, 2021, Barcoo was claimed off waivers by the Arizona Cardinals. He was waived on September 30, 2021 and re-signed to the practice squad. He was released on October 12.

San Francisco 49ers
On November 24, 2021, Barcoo was signed to the San Francisco 49ers practice squad. He was released on January 18, 2022.

Kansas City Chiefs
Barcoo signed with the Kansas City Chiefs on March 24, 2022. He was released on June 16, 2022.

New York Jets
On July 27, 2022, Barcoo signed with the New York Jets. He was released on August 16, 2022.

San Antonio Brahmas
On November 17, 2022, Barcoo was drafted by the San Antonio Brahmas of the XFL.

References

External links
Jacksonville Jaguars bio
San Diego State Aztecs bio

Living people
1998 births
American football cornerbacks
Arizona Cardinals players
Grossmont Griffins football players
Jacksonville Jaguars players
Kansas City Chiefs players
New York Jets players
Players of American football from San Diego
San Antonio Brahmas players
San Diego State Aztecs football players
San Francisco 49ers players